Breezeway may refer to:
 Breezeway, an architectural feature
 Breezeway (car), a type of automobile rear window
 Breezeway house
 Breezeway Records